Prototyphis is a genus of sea snails, marine gastropod mollusks in the subfamily Muricinae of the family Muricidae, the murex snails or rock snails.

Species
Species within the genus Prototyphis include:
 † Prototyphis allani (P. A. Maxwell, 1971) 
 Prototyphis angasi (Crosse, 1863)
  † Prototyphis awamoanus (Finlay, 1930)
 Prototyphis eos (Hutton, 1873)
 Prototyphis gracilis Houart & Héros, 2008
 † Prototyphis tahuensis (P. A. Maxwell, 1971) 
Species brought into synonymy
 Prototyphis (Ponderia) zealandicus (Hutton, 1873): synonym of Ponderia zealandica (Hutton, 1873)
 Prototyphis paupereques (Powell, 1974): synonym of Prototyphis eos paupereques (Powell, 1974)
 Prototyphis zealandicus (Hutton, 1873): synonym of Ponderia zealandica (Hutton, 1873)

References

 Ponder, W.F. (1972). Notes on some Australian genera and species of the family Muricidae (Neogastropoda). Journal of the Malacological Society of Australia 2: 215–248.
 Merle D., Garrigues B. & Pointier J.-P. (2011) Fossil and Recent Muricidae of the world. Part Muricinae. Hackenheim: Conchbooks. 648 pp.

External links

Muricinae